Vladimirs Draguns (born 13 December 1972) is a retired Latvian football midfielder.

References

1972 births
Living people
Latvian footballers
Skonto FC players
FK Liepājas Metalurgs players
FK Auda players
FC Petržalka players
Slovak Super Liga players
Association football midfielders
Latvia international footballers
Latvian expatriate footballers
Expatriate footballers in Slovakia
Latvian expatriate sportspeople in Slovakia